The Ernst-von-Bergmann-Kaserne, before called Warner Kaserne by the US Army (1950-1968), it is a military facility in Munich, Germany, which was built by the architect Oswald Bieber between 1934 and 1936. 
The current name was given in honor of professor Ernst von Bergmann.

History 
The original name of the kaserne was Kaserne "München-Freimann". The barracks were primarily used by the  SS-Standarte 1 "Deutschland" until the end of World War II. After the war the UNRRA used the buildings as a  displaced persons camp.

When the barracks were acquired by the U.S. forces in 1950, they were renamed to Warner Kaserne. The huge main building (earlier on number 1701; today number 1) was the second largest after the Pentagon, which was used by the U.S. Army.

After the US returned the barracks to the Bundeswehr in 1968 it was rebuilt from 1973 to 1980. Since 1980 the main user has been the Bundeswehr Medical Academy. Disbanded users were the Medical Instruction Battalion 851, the Reserve Hospital Group 7609 and a branch of the former Military Hospital Amberg. The "Emil-von-Bering building" has served as a medical ambulance. Also the Bundeswehr Institutes of Radiobiology, of Microbiology, and of Pharmacology and Toxicology have been stationed in the barracks as well as the recruitment center for southern Germany Zentrum für Nachwuchsgewinnung Süd since the 1990s.

See also 
 List of barracks in Munich

References

^ Warner Kaserne in Munich - Warner Kaserne
Link has been changed to http://bobrowen.com/24th/warnerkaserne.html

External links 
 Old photos:
 View from South-East
 View from North-East
 Barrack yard in the South of the main building

Barracks in Munich
Bundeswehr barracks
Milbertshofen-Am Hart